Moreau Park Historic District is a national historic district located near Jefferson City, Cole County, Missouri.  It encompasses seven contributing buildings, one contributing site, and five contributing structures associated with a former resort along the Moreau River near Jefferson City. The district developed between about 1914 and 1950, and includes some historic landscaping features (including 100 stone steps), the native stone Dallmeyer House (c. 1924), Moreau Lodge (1914), one remaining guest cabin, two stone outbuildings, a privy, barn, and concession stand.

It was listed on the National Register of Historic Places in 2009.

References

Historic districts on the National Register of Historic Places in Missouri
Buildings and structures in Cole County, Missouri
National Register of Historic Places in Cole County, Missouri